The Wadestown Covered Bridge was a single-lane wooden covered bridge in Wadestown, Monongalia County, West Virginia, United States. It spanned the Virginia (later West Virginia) branch of Dunkard Creek. It was still standing in 1941 when the Work Projects Administration surveyed the state.  It was in use into the 1950s.

References

See also
List of West Virginia covered bridges

Buildings and structures in Monongalia County, West Virginia
Covered bridges in West Virginia
Road bridges in West Virginia
Transportation in Monongalia County, West Virginia
Wooden bridges in West Virginia